Mass General Brigham (MGB) is a Boston-based non-profit hospital and physician network that includes Brigham and Women's Hospital (BWH) and Massachusetts General Hospital (MGH), two of the nation's most prestigious teaching institutions. It was founded in 1994 with H. Richard Nesson, MD, former president of Brigham and Women's Hospital as CEO of Mass General Brigham and Samuel O. Thier, MD, formerly president of Massachusetts General Hospital as president. Another member of the MGB network, McLean Hospital is the top ranked psychiatric hospital in the United States and maintains the world's largest neuroscientific and psychiatric research program in a private hospital. According to The Boston Globe, by 2008, Mass General Brigham became Massachusetts' "largest private employer and its biggest healthcare provider, treating more than a third of hospital patients in the Boston metropolitan area".

History
In 1994, Brigham and Women's Hospital and Massachusetts General Hospital were brought together by Partners founding co-chairs John H. McArthur and Ferdinand "Moose" Colloredo-Mansfeld. Jack Connors succeeded them as chair in 1996.

In 2016, the then Partners Healthcare moved 14 sites in eastern Massachusetts and moved 4,500 non-hospital employees into  of a new office building located in the Assembly Square neighborhood of Somerville, Massachusetts. Mass General Brigham's executive headquarters remained in the Prudential Tower in Boston.

In April 2017, the United States District Court for the District of Massachusetts announced that Partners HealthCare System and one of its hospitals, Brigham and Women's Hospital, agreed to pay a $10 million fine to resolve allegations that a stem cell research lab fraudulently obtained federal grant funding.

In May 2017, Partners announced they would be cutting more than $600 million in expenses over the next three years in an effort to control higher costs and to become more efficient. The cost-cutting initiative was called Partners 2.0, and the plan looked to reduce costs in research, care delivery, revenue collection, and supply chain. The plan began on October 1, 2017 and eliminated jobs. The company lost $108 million in 2016.

In February 2018, Partners announced that 100 coders would have their jobs outsourced to India in a cost saving move. This was all part of the non-profit hospital and physicians network's three-year plan to reduce $500 million to $800 million in overhead costs.

In February 2018, the state of Massachusetts Public Health Council formally signed off on the acquisition of Massachusetts Eye and Ear. The deal was formalized on April 1, 2018. In a notice published on April 2, 2018, Mass. Eye and Ear's President John Fernandez announce the finalization of the agreement to make MEE a part of the Partners HealthCare hospital and physicians network.

On February 19, 2019 Partners named Dr. Anne Klibanski, as its interim chief executive officer of the hospital Network and will be effective in April 2019.

In June 2019, Partners HealthCare announced Dr. Klibanski, who was named interim chief executive officer in February, now has been named the company's permanent president and chief executive officer.

During the SARS-CoV-2 pandemic, Partners HealthCare, who reported operating income of $484 million (3.5% operating margin) in fiscal year 2019, refused hazard pay to its healthcare workers despite lack of proper PPE.

Rebranding
In late November 2019, Partners HealthCare made the decision to rebrand as the new name Mass General Brigham to reflect upon the organization's best known assets, Massachusetts General Hospital and Brigham and Women's Hospital and to unify the largest employer in Massachusetts. The rebranding will allow Brigham and Women's and Massachusetts General to keep their individual hospital names, but it is unclear if their various community hospitals will have a name change.

Board of directors

Edward P. Lawrence, a retired partner at the Boston law firm Ropes & Gray LLP replaced Jack Connors as Chairman in 2012. Scott M. Sperling became Chairman in 2018. 

Jack Connors, the "Boston businessman and power broker" was the "highest profile figure" at Partners HealthCare System Inc. from 1996 to 2012. Connors and William C. Van Faasen, former CEO of Blue Cross Blue Shield of Massachusetts, co-chaired a business consortium that pushed for the state's universal health coverage law. Connors "worked behind the scenes" to get the Massachusetts health care reform law of 2006 passed.

Notable Mass General Brigham board members have included Charles K. Gifford, Jay O. Light, Cathy E. Minehan, Henri A. Termeer and David Torchiana. York co-founded Lighthouse Capital Partners, based in Cambridge and Menlo Park, in 1994, and led investments in companies such as Vertex Pharmaceuticals, Millennium Pharmaceuticals, Human Genome Sciences, Cascade Communications, Sirocco Systems, Speechworks, and StorageNetworks.

James J. Mongan served president and chief executive of Mass General Brigham in 2003 to 2009. In 2008 Modern Physician magazine named Mongan as the "most powerful physician executive in America". He also received Modern Healthcare's CEO IT Achievement Award. Mongan asked "Connors, who readily admits knowing little about medicine" to extend his tenure.

Gary L. Gottlieb became president and chief executive of Mass General Brigham at the end of 2009 and he asked Connors to remain in his position on the board.

In 2015 David F. Torchiana became president and CEO of Mass General Brigham. His total compensation for 2015 was nearly $4.3 million, with a base salary of $1.9 million, plus bonuses and retirement benefits.  On January 28, 2019, Dr. Torchiana unexpectedly announced his departure as the chief executive of Mass General Brigham effective at the end of April 2019. According to The Boston Globe, the reason for the departure was disagreements between Torchiana and the leaders of the two major hospitals that make up Mass General Brigham.

Composition
Current members of Mass General Brigham include:

Partners Continuing Care
Partners Continuing Care is the Non-Acute Care Services Division of Mass General Brigham headquartered in Boston, Massachusetts. The organization provides rehabilitation, long term acute care, skilled nursing, home health care, and hospice services. Partners Continuing Care consists of the following organizations:
 Partners Healthcare at Home
 Partners Hospice
 Partners Private Care

Spaulding Rehabilitation Network
The Spaulding Rehabilitation Network is a provider of rehabilitation and medical management programs in the Greater Boston area. The network offers inpatient rehabilitation, outpatient rehabilitation, long-term acute care, and skilled nursing services. The main campus of the network is the Spaulding Rehabilitation Hospital, a 132-bed rehabilitation teaching hospital located in Boston, Massachusetts. It is the official teaching hospital for Harvard Medical School's Department of Physical Medicine and Rehabilitation.
 Spaulding Rehabilitation Hospital Boston
 Spaulding Rehabilitation Hospital Cape Cod, formerly Rehabilitation Hospital of the Cape and Islands
 Spaulding Hospital for Continuing Medical Care Cambridge, formerly Spaulding Hospital Cambridge
 Spaulding Hospital for Continuing Medical Care North Shore, formerly Shaughnessy-Kaplan Rehabilitation Hospital (SKRH)
 Spaulding Nursing and Therapy Center North End, formerly North End Rehabilitation and Nursing Center
 Spaulding Nursing and Therapy Center West Roxbury, formerly The Boston Center for Rehabilitative and Sub-Acute Care
 Clark House Nursing Center at Fox Hill Village
 23 outpatient centers

Mass General Brigham International
Mass General Brigham International is a subsidiary of Mass General Brigham that focuses on the advancement of global health. PHI collaborates with foreign embassies, ministries of health, and universities overseas to improve health status indicators directly through patient care initiatives and indirectly through medical conferences and other educational programs for physicians and nurses.

Mass General Brigham's biomedical research "juggernaut was larger than Harvard University's." and embarked on a multibillion-dollar expansion program that rivals those of all other Massachusetts hospitals combined." A doctors' magazine recently named Mass General Brigham's current chief executive the most powerful physician executive in the nation.

Expansion
In 2013, Mass General Brigham's plan to take over 378-bed South Shore Hospital in Weymouth was reviewed due to fears that the expansion plan is anticompetitive, a conduct Mass General Brigham had been accused of over the past four years in other cases.

Blue Cross
Mass General Brigham CEO Thier led Mass General Brigham's efforts to demand higher payments from insurance companies. In May 2000 Thier and William C. Van Faasen, CEO of Blue Cross Blue Shield of Massachusetts—the state's biggest health insurer—agreed to a deal that raised insurance costs all across Massachusetts. They agreed that Van Faasen would substantially increase insurance payments to Mass General Brigham doctors and hospitals, largely correcting the underpayments of the previous 10 years. Prior to this, Thier had informed all three managed care companies that they would all be paid at the same rate.

According to Boston Globe investigative journalists, Blue Cross and other insurers increased the rate they paid Mass General Brigham by 75 percent between 2000 and 2008.

See also
 Partners Harvard Medical International
 Steward Health Care System

References

External links 
 
 Partners International Medical Services
 Spaudling Rehabilitation Network
 Partners Healthcare At Home

1994 establishments in Massachusetts
Healthcare in Boston
Hospital networks in the United States
Life sciences industry
Massachusetts General Hospital
Non-profit organizations based in Boston
Medical and health organizations based in Massachusetts